The Last Escape may refer to:

The Last Escape (1963 film), working title of American World War II epic The Great Escape
The Last Escape (1970 film), American-German World War II feature filmed in 1968
The Last Escape (2010 film), French-language Canadian family drama